Alexis Busin (born 7 September 1995) is a French professional footballer who plays as a midfielder for Boulogne.

Career
Busin is a youth exponent from AS Nancy. He made his Ligue 2 debut on 6 May 2014 against Stade Lavallois replacing Thomas Ayasse after 77 minutes in a 1–0 away defeat. Three days later, he scored his first league goal against Angers SCO. On 29 May 2015 he signed his first professional, three-year, contract with the club.

18 July 2016, Nancy announced Busin would join Clermont Foot on loan. The loan was terminated early, January 2017, due to lack of playing time.

Busin left Nancy in the summer of 2019, at the end of his contract. After six months without a club he joined US Avranches in January 2020, on a contract until the end of the 2019–20 season.

On 27 January 2022, Busin signed with Boulogne.

References

External links

Living people
1995 births
Association football midfielders
French footballers
AS Nancy Lorraine players
Clermont Foot players
US Avranches players
US Boulogne players
Ligue 1 players
Ligue 2 players
Championnat National players
Championnat National 2 players
Championnat National 3 players
Sportspeople from Pas-de-Calais
Footballers from Hauts-de-France